Robert Mason may refer to:

Politics
 Robert Mason (died by 1581), MP for Ludlow
 Robert Mason (died 1591), MP for Ludlow
 Robert Mason (died 1635) (1579–1635), Member of Parliament for Winchester, 1628, and Christchurch, 1626
 Robert Mason (died c. 1669) (c. 1626–c. 1669), Member of Parliament for Winchester, 1666–1669
 Robert Mason (Liberal politician) (1857–1927), Member of Parliament for Wansbeck 1918–1922
 Robert Lindsay Mason (1942–2006), Ulster loyalist politician

Sports
Robert Mason (cricketer) (born 1983), English cricketer
Robert L. Mason, American wrestling coach
Bob Mason (born 1961), American ice hockey goaltender
Bobby Mason (born 1936), English footballer of the 1950s-1960s
 Bobby Joe Mason (1936–2006), American basketball player

Others
Robert Mason (writer) (born 1942), American writer
Robert Mason Pollock, screenwriter/producer
Bob Mason (actor) (1952–2004), British actor
Robert Mason, lead singer for the bands Lynch Mob and Warrant